Midrand is a former municipality in central Gauteng, South Africa. Situated in-between Centurion and Sandton, Midrand now forms part of the City of Johannesburg Metropolitan Municipality.

History
Midrand was established as a municipality in 1981 (in an area known as Halfway House, after its position between Pretoria and Johannesburg), but ceased to be an independent town in the restructuring of local government that followed the end of apartheid in 1994. It was incorporated in the City of Johannesburg Metropolitan Municipality in 2000. It was made part of Region 2 and, as of 2006, when the number of regions were reduced to seven, it forms part of Region A of the City of Johannesburg.

Though no longer an independent town, the name Midrand is still in common use to denote the suburbs around the N1 highway north of the Jukskei River up to the border with City of Tshwane Metropolitan Municipality. (This portion of the N1 highway is also known as the Ben Schoeman Highway). Suburbs that are generally regarded as being in Midrand include among others: Country View, Carlswald, Crowthorne, Glen Austin, Ivory Park, Halfway House, Halfway Gardens, Vorna Valley, Noordwyk, Randjesfontein, Blue Hills and Kyalami Agricultural Holdings.

In 2010, it was reported that the Tshwane Metropolitan Municipality wished to annex Midrand from the City of Johannesburg, reportedly to boost its income, which was severely strained.

The city is relatively modern, having experienced much growth in the last decade. Many businesses have relocated there due to its proximity to good highway links and its location in the economic centre of Gauteng Province. The development of Midrand has resulted in little break between the outskirts of Johannesburg and those of Pretoria.

Townships can be found in Midrand such as Klipfontein view and Ivory Park.

Government 

The South African Civil Aviation Authority is headquartered in Midrand, as is the Railway Safety Regulator (RSR), and the National Credit Regulator. Midrand is also the location of the African Union's Pan-African Parliament and of the NEPAD secretariat.

Politics

Landmarks 
Midrand has the largest  conference centre in South Africa which is known as Gallagher Estate which was built on the former site of Halfway House Primary School, which subsequently moved to new grounds near the fire station.

A landmark of Midrand is the Nizamiye Mosque, opened in 2012 the largest mosque in South Africa. The Classical Turkish-style mosque was personally funded by Turkish-born construction tycoon Ali Katircioglu at a cost of R210 million.

The largest single-phase shopping mall built in Africa, The Mall of Africa, is located in the Waterfall City precinct of the town.

It is now also home to the new headquarters for a multinational auditing-finance company, PWC. (Constructed by WSP) Visible, as currently (2018) the only skyscraper in Midrand. It will however be rivaled by its upcoming twin, The Falcon Building. Both the Falcon and PWC are in the same complex as Mall of Africa. Other landmarks include the Boulders Shopping centre, so named after the heritage site housing huge granite rocks which are approximately 3.5-billion years old.

Business 
Midrand is a thriving business node, home to the offices of major corporations such as Vodacom, Microsoft, Neotel, and Altech Autopage as well as an array of small and medium enterprises (SMEs). In 2013, Atterbury Properties announced plans to build the Mall of Africa, which would be the continent's largest. The Mall of Africa is located within the green, mixed-use Waterfall City precinct. The N1 Business Park and International Business Gateway are among the commercial developments in Midrand.

Education 
The University of South Africa's Graduate School of Business Leadership is located in Midrand. The Pearson Institute of Higher Education formerly known as Midrand Graduate Institute, was officially opened on 9 May 1990. A Varsity College campus was established in 2012. Macmillan Education South Africa relocated their offices in June 2017 from Melrose Arch. There are primary and high schools located in several areas.

Sports 

Kyalami, an international renowned racetrack is in Midrand and is the venue for many of South Africa's premier motor racing events. The South African Lipizzaners riding academy is situated in the smallholdings of Kyalami.

Transport 

Midrand is the home of Grand Central Airport and also to one of the stations in the Gautrain rapid rail system on the route from Pretoria to Sandton.

Climate 
Köppen-Geiger climate classification system classifies its climate as subtropical highland (Cwb).

References

External links 
 Midrand Chamber of Commerce
 Midrand Free Business Directory, Community Forum and Classifieds

Johannesburg Region A